Kenneth Joseph Aspromonte (born September 22, 1931) is a retired American professional baseball player and manager. During his active career, Aspromonte spent all or parts of seven seasons (1957–63) in the Major Leagues, mostly as a second baseman, for the Boston Red Sox, Washington Senators, Cleveland Indians and Los Angeles Angels of the American League, and the Milwaukee Braves and Chicago Cubs of the National League.  He spent three years (1964–66) playing in Japan with the Chunichi Dragons and Taiyo Whales. He also managed in the Major Leagues for three full seasons as skipper of the 1972–74 Indians.

The native of Brooklyn, New York, is the older brother of Bob Aspromonte, who had a 13-year career as a third baseman in the National League.

Playing career
He signed with the Red Sox in 1950 and spent six years in the minors, plus two in military service, before reaching the big leagues in September 1957 after he led the Pacific Coast League in batting average (.334) for the San Francisco Seals. After only 30 games played with Boston in 1957–58, he was traded to the Senators, where he spent almost two full seasons. Traded to the Indians on May 15, he started 78 games at second base and 35 at third base, and batted a career-high .290 with ten home runs. But Cleveland left him exposed to the 1960 Major League Baseball expansion draft and Aspromonte was the 14th player selected by the Angels, 27th overall, in the lottery.

He was the starting second baseman in the Angels' first-ever American League game on April 11, 1961, against the Baltimore Orioles. Batting second in the lineup behind Eddie Yost, Aspromonte went one-for-four at the plate, making one error in eight chances in the field, as Los Angeles won, 7–2. But Aspromonte struggled at the bat through the season's early weeks, and was hitting only .223 when he was placed on waivers and claimed by his old team, the Indians, on July 3. Relegated to a utility role, he played in only 42 games over a full calendar year for Cleveland. The Cubs acquired him in a midwinter deal, but he collected only five hits in 34 at bats in a utility role during the first two months of the  campaign, and he was sent to the Pacific Coast League, where he finished his U.S. pro career. As a big-leaguer, he appeared in 475 games; his 369 hits included 69 doubles, three triples and 19 home runs.

During his three years in Nippon Professional Baseball, Aspromonte batted a robust .273 in 295 games, with 257 hits, 53 doubles and 31 home runs.

Managing career
In 1968, Aspromonte returned to the Indians' organization as a manager in their farm system. After leading the 1969 Reno Silver Sox of the Class A California League to a winning record, he was promoted to Triple-A, where he spent two years at the helm of the Wichita Aeros, Cleveland's top affiliate. But, fortified by the addition via a blockbuster trade of future Baseball Hall of Fame pitcher Gaylord Perry, who won 24 games, the 1972 Indians improved their record substantially. They won 72 of 156 games during the strike-abbreviated campaign and bettered their previous year's winning percentage by 0.92 points.

But the 1973 and 1974 clubs did not materially improve, falling into the division basement with 91 defeats in the former year, and losing 85 games in 1974 despite finishing fourth. His record in 1974 is deceiving, however; the team contended for much of the year-peaking at 45–35 July 4, in first place, and as late as September 8 was 71–70 and only six games back. But then the wheels came off, with the team posting a 6–15 finale to the season, ultimately ending Aspromonte's tenure there. 

The acquisition of Frank Robinson that September — widely seen as the next Cleveland manager, positioned to become the first black pilot in the big-league history — made his position untenable. The Indians then named Robinson their player-manager for 1975, to become the first African-American manager in big-league annals.

References

External links

1931 births
Living people
American expatriate baseball players in Japan
American people of Italian descent
Birmingham Barons players
Boston Red Sox players
Chicago Cubs players
Chunichi Dragons players
Cleveland Indians managers
Cleveland Indians players
Kingston Colonials players
Kinston Eagles players
Lafayette High School (New York City) alumni
Los Angeles Angels players
Louisville Colonels (minor league) players
Major League Baseball second basemen
Milwaukee Braves players
Minor league baseball managers
Oneonta Red Sox players
Roanoke Ro-Sox players
Salt Lake City Bees players
San Francisco Seals (baseball) players
San Jose Red Sox players
Scranton Red Sox players
Sportspeople from Brooklyn
Baseball players from New York City
Taiyō Whales players
Washington Senators (1901–1960) players